Wisemans Bridge (Welsh; Pont-yr-ŵr) is a coastal hamlet between Amroth and Saundersfoot in Pembrokeshire, Wales. The small beachfront community, which is part of the parish of Amroth, was once an important centre for the mineral industry in West Wales. It is now a popular holiday destination within Carmarthen Bay.

Toponym

The name Wisemans Bridge has no definitive origin. In early medieval Wales, the area was part of Llanussyllt but after the Norman conquest it became known as the Parish of St Issells in dedication to the Welsh saint Issel. In 1598, a local entry in the parish records of St Issells mentions a bridge in the locale. This has led to the theory that the name Wisemans Bridge derives directly from the decision to use the crossing rather than take another route. However, research of St Issells' parish records in the 14th century show that an Andrew Wiseman held lands thereabouts as early as 1324. It was first officially recorded as Wisemans Bridge between 1898 and 1908.

History
The valley behind Wisemans Bridge between the 14th and 19th centuries was a centre of industrial activity within the Pembrokeshire Coalfields. By the 19th century, the local high-quality coal was shipped out of Wisemans Bridge in 50- or 60-ton vessels. A 4-foot narrow-gauge railway also transported coal to Saundersfoot Harbour via Coppet Hall. The line was permanently closed in 1939. The old railway through Wisemans Bridge and its tunnels to Saundersfoot are now part of the Pembrokeshire Coast Path, a designated National Trail that was established in 1970.

In 1943, Winston Churchill visited the area as the allies practised for the D Day landings.

References

Amroth, Pembrokeshire
Hamlets in Wales
Carmarthen Bay
Coast of Pembrokeshire